= Colloquium Balticum =

Conference series

The Colloquium Balticum is a conference series of Northern European classicists who study Greek and Latin antiquity and its reception mainly in the Baltic region. The conferences are organized annually or biennially by the members of the Baltic Network of Classical Scholars. As of 2024, the network includes University of Marburg (Germany), University of Lund (Sweden), University of Latvia, University of Tartu (Estonia), Vilnius University (Lithuania), and Saint Petersburg State University (Russia).

== Past conferences ==
1. Colloquium Balticum I – Lund 2001
2. Colloquium Balticum II – Greifswald 2002
3. Colloquium Balticum III – Lund 2003
4. Colloquium Balticum IV – Riga 2004
5. Colloquium Balticum V – Lund 2005
6. Colloquium Balticum VI – Greifswald 2006
7. Colloquium Balticum VII – Tartu 2007
8. Colloquium Balticum VIII – Vilnius 2008
9. Colloquium Balticum IX – Riga 2010
10. Colloquium Balticum X – Vilnius 2011
11. Colloquium Balticum XI – Lund 2012
12. Colloquium Balticum XII – Marburg 2013
13. Colloquium Balticum XIII – Riga 2014
14. Colloquium Balticum XIV. Pontes ad fontes – Tartu 2015
15. Colloquium Balticum XV. Lupus in fabula: representations of animality in Classical culture – Vilnius 2016
16. Colloquium Balticum XVI. De Risu: Representations and Evaluations of Laughter in Greek and Roman Literature – Lund 2018
17. Colloquium Balticum XVII – Marburg 2019
18. Colloquium Balticum XVIII. ἄνδρα μοι ἔννεπε, μοῦσα: Reception, Translation, and Transfer of Homer’s Works Across Cultures – Vilnius 2021
19. Colloquium Balticum XIX. Philologia magistra vitae – Tartu 2022
20. Colloquium Balticum XX. Naturalia et artificialia: Language, Text, Culture – Riga 2024
21. Colloquium Balticum XXI. Odium et amor – Lund 2025
